The New Zealand fantail (Rhipidura fuliginosa) is a small insectivorous bird, the only species of fantail in New Zealand. It has four subspecies: R. f. fuliginosa in the South Island, R. f. placabilis in the North Island, R. f. penita in the Chatham Islands, and the now-extinct R. f. cervina formerly on Lord Howe Island. The species has been considered by many to be conspecific (the same) as the grey fantail of Australia and New Caledonia; however, due to significant differences in its calls, many authorities now treat it as a separate species.

Description

This fantail is mid to dark grey or grey-brown above, yellowish/orange below, with a dark band across the chest below a white throat, white markings over the eye, and (depending on the race) either white-edged or entirely white outer tail feathers. This reveals that the outer tail feathers are light and the centre ones are dark. Some subspecies are found in a darker plumage, notably the "black fantail" morph seen in 4% of South Island birds and less than 1% of North Island birds (it is completely absent from the Chatham Islands). The black morph lacks the white areas and so is dark all over apart from a white spot behind the eye. Fantails are also famous worldwide for their fan-shaped tail.

Juveniles are similar to the adults but have a browner body and indistinct body markings.

Behaviour
During waking hours the bird is almost never still. It flits from perch to perch, sometimes on the ground but mostly on the twigs of a tree or any other convenient object, looking out for flying insects. The birds are not shy, and will often flit within a few metres of people, especially in forested areas and suburban gardens. In doing so, it is able to catch any small flying insects that may have been disturbed by human activities such as walking or digging. Under cold temperatures a flock of fantails will huddle to stay warm.

The bird's call is an almost metallic cheek, either as a single sound or (more often) repeated as a chattering.

Breeding

The New Zealand fantail is a seasonal breeder, nesting from August to March in the North Island, September to January in the South Island and October to January on the Chatham Islands. They usually raise two or more broods per season. 
The birds form compact, cup-shaped nests, usually in the forks of trees, made from moss, bark and fibre, and often completed with spider's web. Both sexes build the nest. The clutch size is usually three to four cream eggs which are spotted grey and brown. The incubation period is around two weeks, and incubation and feeding duties are shared by both adults. Nest building and incubation of the second brood may occur while the fledged young of the first brood are still being fed. Young males may begin breeding two months after fledging. The nests of the New Zealand fantail are occasionally parasitised by the two species of cuckoo in New Zealand.

Approximately 45% of 81 nesting attempts that were monitored in urban Wellington successfully fledged chicks: one in four nests being abandoned or deserted and just over one in four suffering predation. Nests built on thin branches were more likely to escape predation from ship rats than those built on thick branches.

In mythology
In Māori mythology, the piwakawaka is a messenger, bringing death or news of death from the gods to the people. The bulbous eyes and erratic flying behaviour of the bird is attributed to it being squeezed by Māui for not revealing the whereabouts of his ancestress Mahuika, the fire deity.
Tiwakawaka is also the name of one of the first Māori settlers to New Zealand.

Gallery

References

Falla, R.A., Sibson, R.B., & Tributt, E.G., (1970). A field guide to the birds of New Zealand. London: Collins.

External links

 Grey Fantail videos, photos & sounds on the Internet Bird Collection

New Zealand fantail
New Zealand fantail
New Zealand fantail
Articles containing video clips
Birds with names in Moriori